Matthew James Howard (born 5 December 1970) is an English retired professional footballer who made one appearance in the Football League for Brentford as a right back. After his release in 1989, he dropped into non-League football and made over 100 appearances with both Boreham Wood and Hendon.

Playing career

Brentford
After beginning his career in the youth system at hometown club Watford, Driscoll joined the youth team at Third Division club Brentford in 1987. He made his professional debut on the final day of the 1987–88 season, when he came on as a half time substitute for Roger Stanislaus in a 2–1 defeat to York City at Griffin Park. He received a yellow card, as manager Steve Perryman had forgotten to inform the referee of the change. Howard failed to make a first team appearance during the 1988–89 season, but was a part of the youth team which reached the semi-finals of the 1988–89 FA Youth Cup. Howard departed Brentford in January 1990, having made just a single first team appearance.

Non-League 
After his release from Brentford, Howard had a long career in non-League football, playing for Isthmian League clubs St Albans City, Boreham Wood, Hayes, Chesham United, Hendon, Leyton, Hitchin Town, Leighton Town and Aylesbury United. He finished his career with Hertfordshire Senior County League Premier Division club Elliott Star, for whom he made 24 appearances in his final two seasons.

Career statistics

Honours 
Hendon
 Isthmian League Full Members Cup: 1997–98

References

External links 

 

1970 births
Living people
English footballers
Association football defenders
Brentford F.C. players
Sportspeople from Watford
English Football League players
Watford F.C. players
St Albans City F.C. players
Boreham Wood F.C. players
Hayes F.C. players
Chesham United F.C. players
Hendon F.C. players
Leyton F.C. players
Hitchin Town F.C. players
Leighton Town F.C. players
Aylesbury United F.C. players
Isthmian League players